The Suzuki Brezza (known as Vitara Brezza for the first generation) is a subcompact crossover SUV from Suzuki and manufactured by Maruti Suzuki in India. The Brezza is the first Suzuki-branded car which was fully developed in India. The model was designed as a smaller alternative to the global market Vitara and targeted to young audiences. It is only available for right-hand drive emerging markets in Asia and Africa. The first-generation model was also marketed by Toyota as the Toyota Urban Cruiser between 2020 and 2022.

As in the original Vitara model, the name "Vitara" is derived from English word "vital," as in "vitality," while the name "Brezza" means "breeze" in Italian.



First generation (YF; 2016) 

The Vitara Brezza was first unveiled in India at the 13th Auto Expo in February 2016. It was previewed by the XA Alpha concept car that was showcased in 2012. The production model is built on global market Vitara's platform. In 2016, the vehicle contains 98 percent Indian parts.

The Vitara Brezza is Suzuki's first model in the sub-4 metre subcompact crossover SUV segment in India, which fits the lower bracket of India's GST structure.

The engine is mated to  either a 5-speed manual or a 5-speed automated manual transmission. The diesel-powered Vitara Brezza is also exported to India's neighboring countries, such as to Nepal.

Facelift 
The Vitara Brezza received its facelift in February 2020. The front bumper, skid plates, headlights, taillights, and wheels were redesigned. The sole turbo-diesel engine was replaced by a Bharat Stage 6 stage-compliant 1.5-litre K15B four-cylinder petrol engine. This engine is mated to either a 5-speed manual or 4-speed automatic transmission, both equipped with SHVS (Smart Hybrid Vehicle by Suzuki) mild hybrid system. The newer engine made the Vitara Brezza lose its GST advantage as the engine displacement exceeding the 1,200 cc limit.

Suzuki expanded the export of the Vitara Brezza to several right-hand drive African and Brunei markets since 2021, which is enabled by the use of petrol engine that is more suitable for markets outside India. The SHVS mild hybrid system is only equipped for export models in South Asia, such as Bangladesh and Nepal.

Toyota Urban Cruiser 
The facelifted Vitara Brezza is sold by Toyota as the Toyota Urban Cruiser, which debuted in India on 22 August 2020. It received a differentiated front bumper design from the Vitara Brezza. The vehicle was also introduced in South Africa in March 2021. It was discontinued in late 2022 and indirectly replaced by the larger Urban Cruiser Hyryder.

The "Urban Cruiser" nameplate was previously used for the twin version of the Japanese market XP110 series Toyota Ist that was sold in Europe between 2008 and 2014.

Safety 
Maruti Suzuki Vitara Brezza

Toyota Urban Cruiser

Urban Cruiser's results differed from the Vitara Brezza's due to Toyota's recommendation of a safer position for the Group 0+ children which improved dynamics of the 18 month-old child in the test. The dual seatbelt reminders has been made mandatory in India since July 2019, which partially explained the increase in adult occupant protection score.

Second generation (YH; 2022) 

The second-generation Brezza was unveiled in India on 30 June 2022 without the "Vitara" moniker.

The vehicle retained the body shell platform of previous generation with major revisions. It came with revised front and rear fascia, redesigned C-pillar, thicker body claddings, redesigned 16-inch alloy wheels, shark fin-type antenna and electric sunroof. The dimensions are also nearly identical to the outgoing model, except for the  height increase due to the shark fin antenna. On the interior, the dashboard received a layered design with floating car audio display, along with redesigned steering wheel (with additional telescopic adjustment) and instrument cluster, wider rear bench seat, and addition of wireless charging dock, interior ambient lighting and rear AC vents. Electronic Stability Program (ESP) and Hill-Start Assist (HSA) are standard across the lineup, with six airbags also standard for the flagship ZXi+ grade.

The engine is replaced by the K15C Dualjet petrol unit with dual injectors, mated to either 5-speed manual or a 6-speed automatic transmission option replacing the old 4-speed unit. The 12 V SHVS mild hybrid system is also carried over.

Awards 
In 2017, the Vitara Brezza was named as the Indian Car of the Year.

Sales

References

External links 

 

Vitara Brezza
Vitara Brezza
Cars introduced in 2016
2020s cars
Mini sport utility vehicles
Crossover sport utility vehicles
Front-wheel-drive vehicles